Burbank is a town in western Osage County, Oklahoma, United States. The population was 141 at the 2010 census, a 9 percent decrease from the figure of 155 recorded in 2000.

History
Burbank was founded in 1903 on the Osage Reservation.  The founder was Anthony "Gabe" Carlton, a mixed-blood Osage and a Chouteau family descendant, who owned the townsite and named it after the artist Elbridge Ayer Burbank (1858-1949) who spent his life painting the Indians of over 125 tribes.

Burbank had about 200 residents and an economy based on farming and ranching until May 1920 when E.W. Marland discovered petroleum northeast of the town. Burbank became a boom town, and other towns in the area such as Whizbang sprang up overnight to exploit the rich petroleum resources. The Burbank field was mostly located in Osage County but extended into Kay County. Burbank quickly grew into a town of 3,000 people.

Several major petroleum companies participated in the exploitation of the Burbank Field.  Leases of oil land were obtained from the Osage Indians, usually by auction under the "Million Dollar Elm" tree in Pawhuska, the county seat and capital of the Osage Indians.  Colonel Ellsworth Walters was the auctioner and more than a million dollars was often bid for the mineral rights to 160 acre (65 ha) tracts in the Burbank Field.  Rich and famous oilmen such as Marland, Frank Phillips, L. E. Phillips, Waite Phillips, and William G. Skelly stood in the shade of the Elm tree and bid in the auctions.  
Oil production in the Burbank field expanded from 134,408 barrels in 1920 to a peak production of 26,206,741 barrels in 1923.  Production dropped by one-half in 1926 and by 1930 the boom period was over.  Burbank's population dropped to 372 in 1930. The value of the 160 million barrels the Burbank field produced during its heyday was almost 286 million dollars.

The Osage tribe and its members received $45 million in royalties from the Burbank field in the 1920s.   The Osage, unlike many tribes, had retained collective ownership of mineral rights on their former reservation.  Osage with a full headright (those on the 1906 tribal roll) received up to $15,000 each annually in oil royalties, the equivalent of more than $150,000 in 2010 dollars. The Osage were the "richest people in the world."

Geography
Burbank is located at  (36.695983, -96.727978).

Demographics

As of the census of 2000, there were 155 people, 63 households, and 40 families residing in the town. The racial makeup of the town was 70.32% White, 20.00% Native American, 0.65% from other races, and 9.03% from two or more races. Hispanic or Latino of any race were 1.29% of the population.

There were 63 households, out of which 31.7% had children under the age of 18 living with them, 52.4% were married couples living together, 6.3% had a female householder with no husband present, and 36.5% were non-families. 33.3% of all households were made up of individuals, and 19.0% had someone living alone who was 65 years of age or older. The average household size was 2.46 and the average family size was 3.20.

In the town, the population was spread out, with 33.5% under the age of 18, 3.9% from 18 to 24, 26.5% from 25 to 44, 21.9% from 45 to 64, and 14.2% who were 65 years of age or older. The median age was 36 years. For every 100 females, there were 82.4 males. For every 100 females age 18 and over, there were 87.3 males.

The median income for a household in the town was $20,000, and the median income for a family was $30,750. Males had a median income of $25,000 versus $21,250 for females. The per capita income for the town was $13,686. About 17.1% of families and 24.1% of the population were below the poverty line, including 42.5% of those under the age of eighteen and 8.0% of those 65 or over.

Notable person
Hub Andrews, baseball player

See also 
 Bank of Burbank

References

External links
 Encyclopedia of Oklahoma History and Culture - Burbank
 Encyclopedia of Oklahoma History and Culture - Burbank Field

Towns in Osage County, Oklahoma
Towns in Oklahoma
Populated places established in 1903
1903 establishments in Oklahoma Territory